Victoria is a hamlet in Cornwall, England, UK.

The hamlet contains a pub, petrol station business park and Roche railway station.

References

Hamlets in Cornwall